Darian Dale DeVries (born April 7, 1975) is the head men's basketball coach at Drake University.

Coaching history
A native of Aplington, Iowa, DeVries played collegiately at Northern Iowa. After graduating, he joined Creighton University as a graduate manager in its men's basketball program. After three seasons as a graduate manager, DeVries was named assistant coach in 2001. He stayed with Creighton following the departure of Dana Altman and the hire of Greg McDermott.

DeVries became a head coach for the first time when he accepted the job at former conference rival Drake in March 2018.

DeVries' steady hand at the helm of the Bulldogs helped the program start the season with 9–2 record, the program's best open to a season since 2007–08. The Bulldogs win over Valparaiso Feb. 16 was the team's 20th win of the season to mark the sixth 20-win season in program history. This accomplishment came after inheriting the second-fewest returning letterwinners in the nation.

DeVries' ability as a master tactician was further proven when starting point guard and potential MVC Larry Bird Player of the Year candidate Nick Norton suffered a season-ending knee injury in the first game of the MVC season. Despite a sense of complete despair from the Bulldog faithful, DeVries' team proceeded to win four of its next five games to move into a tie for third place in the league standings. At the close of the 2018–19 season, he was named MVC Coach of the Year.

In his next season, DeVries made history as the first coach to lead an 8-seed to a win over the 1-seed in the Missouri Valley Conference Tournament ("Arch Madness"), trouncing UNI 77–56.

DeVries' success at Drake continued in the 2020–2021 season where he took the team to a 18–0 start which included the Bulldogs' inclusion in the AP Top 25 poll.  After losing two of their top players to injury, DeVries' once again showed his masterful hand at leading Drake to their first at-large NCAA Tournament bid in years, and their first NCAA tournament win in 50 years to the day with a win over former Valley foe Wichita State.  DeVries was also named MVC Coach of the Year for the second time in three years. In March 2021, DeVries signed an 8-year contract extension with Drake, keeping him in Des Moines through the 2028–29 season.

DeVries achieved his 100th win on November 21, 2022, at the US Virgin Islands Paradise Jam against Tarleton State. (71-64)

Personal life
DeVries is the older brother of former University of Iowa All-American and NFL defensive end Jared DeVries. His sister is Jodi Vogt, a counselor in Waukee, Iowa.

Head coaching record

References

External links
 Drake University profile

1975 births
Living people
American men's basketball coaches
American men's basketball players
Basketball coaches from Iowa
Basketball players from Iowa
College men's basketball head coaches in the United States
Creighton Bluejays men's basketball coaches
Drake Bulldogs men's basketball coaches
Northern Iowa Panthers men's basketball players
People from Butler County, Iowa